Highs and Lows is a Hong Kong television crime drama serial produced by TVB under executive producer Lam Chi-wah. The drama stars Michael Miu, Raymond Lam, Kate Tsui, Elaine Ng, Ella Koon and Ben Wong. It originally aired from 24 September to 4 November 2012, on Hong Kong's Jade, and ran for 30 episodes.

Synopsis
As a Senior Inspector of the Narcotics Bureau Operation Unit, Gordon Heung (Michael Miu) profoundly abhors evil. He and Wai Sai-Lok (Raymond Lam) – Senior Inspector of the Intelligence Unit – have closely co-operated with each other as peer mentors, frequently solving drug trafficking cases for the Police Force. During an operation to knock down the targets, Sai-Lok discovers clues that Gordon is most likely the corrupt cop in a collusion conspiracy with drug dealers. Apart from launching a secret investigation into Gordon, Sai-Lok is also alienated from him by the evil-willed Chief Inspector of the Operation Unit – Brian Poon (Ben Wong). Having undergone various disputes against each other, the long-term brotherly relationship between Sai-Lok and Gordon appears full of contradictions.

Meanwhile, following an investigation, Sai-Lok falls in love with a snitch – Pat Chan (Kate Tsui), who suffers from low self-esteem due to her humble beginning. Deliberately denying her affection to Sai-Lok, Pat gives up on him so that his secret admirer – Sandy Ko (Ella Koon), a rookie police officer – can have the chance, leading to a subtle relationship among the three. Feeling life is so dreary, Pat ultimately digs her own grave by becoming a new generation of drug dealers, involved in drug trafficking and provoking the police force. With intense sorrow, Sai-Lok then joins forces with Gordon against Pat, waging a chain of bitter battles.

Production
A trailer for the TVB 2012 Sales Presentation trailer was shot earlier during October 2011  and the Sales Presentation was aired on 17 December 2011. The trailer featured Roger Kwok, Michael Miu, Kevin Cheng, Kate Tsui and Joyce Tang. Kwok portrayed a triad mole sent to the Narcotics Bureau (NB), Miu portrayed an undercover cop from NB, Cheng portrayed an NB officer, Tsui portrayed a pregnant drug dealer and Tang portrayed Miu's wife. Kwok, Cheng and Tang were unable to film due to conflicting schedules. As a result, Elaine Ng, Raymond Lam and Ella Koon were added. A costume ceremony was held on 18 January 2012 at Tseung Kwan O TVB City Studio One at 12:30PM.

Cast

Main cast

Other cast

Awards and nominations
Nominated — My AOD Favourites Award for My Favourite Supporting Actor (Ben Wong)
Won — 2012 TVB Anniversary Award for Most Popular Female Character (Kate Tsui)
Nominated — 2012 TVB Anniversary Award for Best Drama

Viewership ratings
The following is a table that includes a list of the total ratings points based on television viewership.

International Broadcast
  - NTV7 (Malaysia)
  - Mediacorp Channel U and Mediacorp Channel 8
 -HTV2

References

External links
Official TVB website
K-TVB.net

TVB dramas
Hong Kong action television series
Serial drama television series
2012 Hong Kong television series debuts
2012 Hong Kong television series endings